Fuyuan Dongji Airport  is an airport serving Fuyuan County, in China's Heilongjiang province. Construction began after the airport was approved by the national government in May 2012. The airport cost 500 million yuan to build, and was opened for operations on 26 May 2014, initially with a single scheduled flight to Harbin.

Facilities
The airport has a runway that is 2,500 meters long and 45 meters wide (class 4C), a 4,000 square-meter terminal building, and four aircraft parking aprons.  It is designed to handle 260,000 passengers and 1,430 tons of cargo per year by 2020.

Airlines and destinations

See also
List of airports in China
List of the busiest airports in China

References

Airports in Heilongjiang
Airports established in 2014
2014 establishments in China